Murdered by My Father is a British drama television film written by Vinay Patel, directed by Bruce Goodison and produced by Toby Welch, and starring Adeel Akhtar and Kiran Sonia Sawar, that first aired on BBC One in March 2016. The drama tells the story of an honour killing of a British Asian Muslim teenage girl by her father.

It won Best Single Drama at the Royal Television Society Awards in 2017.

Summary
Widowed father Shahzad is bringing up two children, Salma and Hassan, alone. Teenager Salma has been promised to Haroon in an arranged marriage but she falls in love with Imi. Following a confrontation with Haroon and with men from the community, Shahzad murders his daughter and kills himself.

Cast
Adeel Akhtar as Shahzad 
Kiran Sonia Sawar as Salma
Mawaan Rizwan as Imi
Salman Akhtar as Haroon
Reiss Jeram as Hassan

Critical reception
Ceri Redford, writing in The Daily Telegraph, described the drama as "nuanced and unbearably heart-breaking" and "a brave piece of television". Kasia Delgado, in the Radio Times, wrote that the drama "deserves a Bafta [award] for depicting this very real issue so brilliantly".

References

External links

Murdered By My Father Preview BBC Media Centre
Murdered By My Father BBC iPlayer

2016 films
2016 in British television
2016 television films
BBC television dramas
English-language television shows
Filicide in fiction
Films about race and ethnicity
Films about honor killing
Murder–suicide in television